Taunton station or Taunton railway station could refer to:
 Taunton railway station in Taunton, England
 Taunton station (Amtrak), in Taunton, Massachusetts
 Taunton station (MBTA) in Taunton, Massachusetts